800 B.C. (with B.C. stylized as Before Corona) is the debut mixtape by American rapper Fivio Foreign. It was released on April 24, 2020, by Columbia Records. It features guest appearances from Meek Mill, Lil Tjay, Quavo, and Lil Baby. Production was handled by 808Melo, Axl, Bordeaux, Non Native, Saman, Szamz, and Yamaica.

Critical reception

Fred Thomas of AllMusic praised the project for having it filled with "harsh drill drums, intense flows, and intimidating ad-libs into compact presentations of fury and swagger". However, Ben Dandridge-Lemco of Pitchfork gave it criticism by stating how "it feels lazily thrown together, with mostly forgettable songs" and that he has "yet to prove himself".

Track listing

References

2020 EPs
Fivio Foreign EPs
Columbia Records albums